LiveProfile is a messaging app and mobile social network, owned and operated by LiveProfile Inc., for Android and iOS. It allows users to the send and receive messages, photos, videos, audio, as well as other types of content.

History
LiveProfile was founded by Phil Karl and William Key and launched on October 16, 2010. It quickly gained widespread popularity and received as many as 200,000 new user registrations per day. LiveProfile raised Series A financing from Lightspeed Venture Partners and Naval Ravikant

In November 2011, BlackBerry Ltd acquired LiveProfile, Inc with the intention of integrating with BlackBerry Messenger, as part of their cross-platform strategy shift. This plan, considered by BlackBerry Co-CEO Jim Balsillie a top strategic priority, deeply divided the company as such a shift would cause a decline in device sales. Ultimately the strategy shift was cancelled and the LiveProfile app was discontinued in December 2013.

Relaunch and availability 

The original LiveProfile team announced in March 2019 that they are working to soon relaunch LiveProfile as a new independent company.

Features
 Messages are of unlimited length.
 Users can choose a personal LiveProfile display picture and status.
 Real-time confirmations when messages are delivered and read.
 Users can also share photos, videos and more with multiple contacts at once.
 Users can post their LiveProfile status to Facebook or Twitter accounts.
 Contacts can be added by scanning Facebook friends and Twitter contacts, Email addresses associated with the user's LiveProfile, Mobile phone numbers or sharing PINs.
 Users can reveal the music that is playing on their smartphone.
 Users can send music files to their friends.

References

External links 
 

BlackBerry software
Android (operating system) software
IOS software
Instant messaging clients